Thomas English House, also known as the Murchison House, is a historic home located at Camden, Kershaw County, South Carolina. It was built about 1800, and is a two-story, five-bay, hip-roofed, frame and beaded weatherboard Federal I-house.  It is set on brick piers connected by a recessed, stucco-covered, concrete block curtain wall. The front façade features a one-story, full-length, hip-roofed porch.

It was listed on the National Register of Historic Places in 1993.

References 

Houses on the National Register of Historic Places in South Carolina
Federal architecture in South Carolina
Houses completed in 1800
Camden, South Carolina
Houses in Kershaw County, South Carolina
National Register of Historic Places in Kershaw County, South Carolina